The 500 metres distance for women in the 2010–11 ISU Speed Skating World Cup was contested over 12 races on six occasions, out of a total of eight World Cup occasions for the season, with the first occasion taking place in Heerenveen, Netherlands, on 12–14 November 2010, and the final occasion also taking place in Heerenveen on 4–6 March 2011.

Jenny Wolf of Germany successfully defended her title from the previous season, while Lee Sang-hwa of South Korea came second, and Margot Boer of the Netherlands came third.

Top three

Race medallists

Standings
Standings as of 6 March 2011 (end of the season).

References

Women 0500
ISU